Božidar "Cikota" Stanišić (21 October 1936 – 3 January 2014) was a water polo player from Montenegro. He was part of the Yugoslav teams that won a silver medal at the 1964 Olympics and placed fourth in 1960. He won another silver medal at the 1958 European Championships.

Stanišić learned to swim aged 14. Two years later started playing water polo for PKV Jadran and won with them the national title in 1958 and 1959; he later played for VK Bijela and coached both teams. Stanišić was a lawyer by profession. He was voted the Montenegrin Athlete of the Year a record four times, in 1959, 1961, 1963 and 1965.

See also
 List of Olympic medalists in water polo (men)

References

External links

 

1936 births
2014 deaths
People from Herceg Novi
Serbs of Montenegro
Montenegrin male water polo players
Yugoslav male water polo players
Olympic water polo players of Yugoslavia
Water polo players at the 1960 Summer Olympics
Water polo players at the 1964 Summer Olympics
Olympic silver medalists for Yugoslavia
Olympic medalists in water polo
Medalists at the 1964 Summer Olympics
Mediterranean Games gold medalists for Yugoslavia
Mediterranean Games silver medalists for Yugoslavia
Competitors at the 1959 Mediterranean Games
Competitors at the 1963 Mediterranean Games
Mediterranean Games medalists in water polo